Courtney Rae Hudson (born 1973) is an Associate Justice of the Arkansas Supreme Court. She was elected to the position in 2010.

Education 

Hudson graduated Phi Beta Kappa and magna cum laude from the University of Arkansas at Fayetteville with a Bachelor of Arts in 1994. She graduated with high honors from the University of Arkansas School of Law in 1997.

Early career 
After law school, Hudson was a law clerk for Judge Terry Crabtree and Judge Frank Aery, both of the Arkansas Court of Appeals.  In 2008, she was elected to the Arkansas Court of Appeals.

Elections

2010
Hudson defeated Crittenden County Circuit Court Judge John Fogleman for the Position 3 Associate Justice position. The election was for an eight-year term. During the campaign, former President Bill Clinton and former Arkansas 3rd Representative John Paul Hammerschmidt supported Hudson.

The election saw hundreds of thousands of dollars spent by dark money groups attempting to defeat Hudson, making it the most expensive Supreme Court election in Arkansas history to that point. Hudson won by a 57% to 43% margin.

2016
Hudson sought the Chief Justice position in November 2016 shortly after the announcement of Howard Brill as interim chief justice. She was able to maintain her Position 3 seat while running for chief justice. Stone County Circuit Court Judge John Dan Kemp won the seat by a 58–42 margin.

2018
Seeking reelection, Hudson won the most votes in a three-way non-partisan judicial election on May 22, 2018. A runoff election was held between Hudson and David Sterling in November 2018.  Hudson won the runoff by a 56% to 44% margin.

Personal life
Hudson was married to John Goodson of Texarkana, Arkansas, a powerful attorney, political donor, and member of the University of Arkansas Board of Trustees. She divorced Mark Henry, her husband of 14 years, shortly after winning election to the Arkansas Supreme Court. On August 27, 2019, Goodson was granted a divorce decree and henceforth will revert to her maiden name, Courtney Rae Hudson.

References

External links
Courtney Hudson Goodson
The Voter's Self Defense System

1973 births
Living people
Place of birth missing (living people)
Justices of the Arkansas Supreme Court
University of Arkansas alumni
University of Arkansas School of Law alumni
21st-century American judges
21st-century American women judges